Events of 2019 in Romania.

Incumbents  
 President: Klaus Iohannis
 Prime Minister: Viorica Dăncilă (until 4 November) Ludovic Orban (since 4 November) 
 President of the Senate: Călin Popescu-Tăriceanu (until 2 September) Teodor Meleșcanu (since 10 September)
 President of the Chamber of Deputies: Liviu Dragnea (until 27 May) Marcel Ciolacu (since 29 May)

Events

January 
 1 January – Start of the 2019 Romanian Presidency of the Council of the European Union.

May 
 26 May
 2019 European Parliament election in Romania: The biggest opposition party – PNL – wins the vote in the country while the new opposition alliance made of USR and PLUS wins the vote in the big cities and diaspora. The senior ruling party – PSD – gets a score of under 24%, down from 37.6% in the previous election. Their coalition partners from ALDE drop under the 5% threshold.
 The referendum against judicial amnesties reaches the required turnout to be valid.
 27 May – The High Court of Cassation and Justice upholds the ruling sentencing Liviu Dragnea, leader of the governing PSD, for three and a half years in jail for of his involvement in the hiring of two fictitious workers in his electoral stronghold.
 29 May – The Chamber of Deputies plenary elects Social Democrat Marcel Ciolacu as its President.

June 
 30 June – End of the 2019 Romanian Presidency of the Council of the European Union.

August 
 26 August – ALDE decides to leave the ruling coalition and join the opposition. As a result, three of its four ministers resign.

September 
 2 September – Călin Popescu-Tăriceanu resigns as President of the Senate.
 10 September – Teodor Meleșcanu is elected President of the Senate with 73 votes against PNL candidate Alina Gorghiu.

October 
 10 October – Dăncilă Cabinet collapses after losing a no-confidence vote.

November 
 4 November – PNL leader Ludovic Orban is voted in as the new Prime Minister of Romania. PSD and PRO Romania officially boycott the vote.

Deaths

January

 5 January – Emil Brumaru, writer and poet (b. 1938)
 8 January – Cornel Trăilescu, conductor and composer (b. 1926)
 20 January – Petre Milincovici, 82, Romanian Olympic rower (1960).
 27 January – Henry Chapier, 85, Romanian-born French journalist and film critic.

February

 3 February – Stephen Negoesco, 93, Romanian-American Hall of Fame soccer player and manager.

March

 5 March – Doru Popovici, composer, musicologist, writer and journalist.
 10 March – Gheorghe Naghi, director and actor (Telegrame).
 18 March – Egon Balas, 96, Romanian mathematician.
 20 March – Leonard Wolf, 96, Romanian-born American poet.
 23 March – Tudor Caranfil, 87, Romanian film critic, TV producer and film historian. 
 24 March – Cornelia Tăutu, composer (b. 1938)

April

 1 April – Vladimir Orloff, 90, Romanian-Canadian cellist and music teacher.
 8 April – Josine Ianco-Starrels, 92, Romanian-born American art curator.
 16 April – Valentin Plătăreanu, 82, Romanian actor and director.

May

 20 May – Remus Opriș, 60, Romanian politician, MP (1992–2000).
 25 May – Nicolae Pescaru, 76, Romanian footballer (Brașov, national team).

June

 7 June – Elisabeta Ionescu, 66, Romanian Olympic handball player, world championship silver medalist (1973).
 18 June – Pavel Chihaia, 97, Romanian novelist and political dissident.
 20 June – 
 Dumitru Focșeneanu, 83, Romanian Olympic bobsledder (1972), stroke.
 Alexa Mezincescu, 82, Romanian ballet dancer and choreographer.

July

 4 July – Eva Mozes Kor, 85, Romanian-born American Holocaust survivor and author, founder of CANDLES Holocaust Museum and Education Center.
 25 July – Mihai Mandache, 58, Romanian Olympic swimmer (1980).
 29 July – Traian Ivănescu, 86, Romanian football player and coach.
 30 July – Marcian Bleahu, 95, Romanian geologist, writer and politician, Senator (1990–1992, 1996–2000) and Minister of the Environment (1991–1992).

August

 1 August – Puși Dinulescu, 76, Romanian playwright and film director, heart attack.
 3 August – Marcel Toader, 56, Romanian rugby union player (Steaua București, national team), heart attack.
 8 August – Marius Todericiu, 49, Romanian football player (Brașov, Weismain) and manager (Darmstadt 98), suicide.
 12 August – Florin Halagian, 80, Romanian football player (Dinamo București) and manager (Argeș Pitești, national team).

September

 7 September – Sava Dumitrescu, pharmacologist (b. 1927)
 18 September – Alexandru Darie, 60, Romanian theater director.

October

 15 October – Tamara Buciuceanu, 90, Romanian actress (Silent Wedding, Everybody in Our Family), heart disease.
 29 October – Mihai Constantinescu, singer

November

 2 November – Leo Iorga, 54, Romanian rock singer and guitarist, lung cancer.
 3 November – Sorin Frunzăverde, 59, Romanian politician, MP (2007–2009) and Minister of National Defence (2000, 2006–2007), kidney disease.
 5 November – Larion Serghei, 67, Romanian sprint canoer, Olympic bronze medalist (1976).
 16 November – Bogdan Niculescu-Duvăz, 69, Romanian politician, MP (1990–2016).
 20 November – Dorel Zugrăvescu, 88, Romanian geophysicist.

December

 23 December – Georgeta Snegur, 82, Romanian-born Moldovan socialite, First Lady (1990–1997).

See also
 
2019 in the European Union
Romania in the Eurovision Song Contest 2019

References

External links

Years of the 21st century in Romania
2010s in Romania
 
Romania
Romania